Kalek is a municipality and village in Chomutov District in the Ústí nad Labem Region of the Czech Republic. It has about 300 inhabitants.

Administrative parts
Villages of Jindřichova Ves and Načetín are administrative parts of Kalek.

References

Villages in Chomutov District
Villages in the Ore Mountains